York Dominican Friary was a friary in North Yorkshire, England.

Burials
Humphrey de Bohun, 4th Earl of Hereford
Maud (or Matilda) de Balliol, wife of Bryan FitzAlan, Lord FitzAlan

Sir Bryan Stapleton (grandson of Bryan Stapleton) and his wife Agnes Goddard Stapleton
Lady Elizabeth Ferrers Greystoke

References

Monasteries in North Yorkshire
History of York
Dominican monasteries in England